The men's mass start competition at the 2017 World Single Distances Speed Skating Championships was held on 12 February 2017.

Results
The race was started at 20:33.

References

Men's mass start